A Broadway Saint is a 1919 American silent comedy film directed by Harry O. Hoyt and starring Montagu Love, George Bunny and Helen Weir.

Cast
 Montagu Love as Dick Vernon
 George Bunny as Uncle Galt
 Helen Weir as Mazie Chateaux 
 Emile La Croix as Professor Lackland
 Augusta Burmeister as Mrs. Unger
 Emily Fitzroy as Martha Galt
 Annie Laurie Spence asLucilla Galt
 Mrs. Stuart Robson as Madam Chateaux
 Edward Arnold as 	Mr. Frewen
 Sally Crute as Mrs. Frewen
 Estelle Taylor as 	The Parisian

References

Bibliography
 Katchmer, George A. Eighty Silent Film Stars: Biographies and Filmographies of the Obscure to the Well Known. McFarland, 1991.

External links

1919 films
1919 comedy films
Silent American comedy films
Films directed by Harry O. Hoyt
American silent feature films
1910s English-language films
American black-and-white films
World Film Company films
1910s American films